Shahbaz Khani (also Romanized as Shahbāz Khānī and Shahbāzkhānī) is a village in Khesht Rural District, Khesht District, Kazerun County, Fars Province, Iran. At the 2006 census, its population was 967, in 178 families.

References 

Populated places in Kazerun County